Administrative and territorial division of the Republic of Bashkortostan is regulated by the Law #178-z of the Republic of Bashkortostan, passed by the State Assembly—Kurultai on April 20, 2005.  The Law established the following classification:
administrative units:
district—an administrative unit established to govern selsoviets, rural settlement councils, and  towns under that district's jurisdiction.  Districts cover territories with population of at least 20,000.
selsoviet—an administrative unit established to govern one or several rural localities with adjacent territories.  Selsoviets cover territories with populations of at least 1,000.
settlement council—an administrative unit established to govern an urban-type settlement with adjacent territories and/or selsoviets.  Settlement councils have not been implemented in practice.
inhabited localities:
urban localities:
city/town under republic's jurisdiction;
city district—an administrative unit of cities under republic's jurisdiction established to improve municipal government efficiency.
city/town under a district's jurisdiction
urban-type settlement:
work settlement;
suburban (dacha) settlement; not implemented in practice;
resort settlement; not implemented in practice
rural localities:
aul;
khutor;
selo;
village
closed administrative-territorial formations—territories under the federal government management with travel and residency restrictions; usually military objects.

All administrative units have administrative centers, defined as urban or rural localities housing the Government of the Republic of Bashkortostan, or municipal and local government organs.

Changes in the overall administrative and territorial structure of the Republic are authorized by the State Assembly—Kurultai.  All changes must later be registered in the Russian Classification of Objects of Administrative Division on the federal level.

Administrative and municipal divisions

References

 
Bashkortostan, Republic of